Žunovnica is a block in the town of Hadžići, Bosnia and Herzegovina. It consists of three streets, Igmanska, Žunovačka and Tinohovo with a population of around 2,000.

Demographics 
According to the 2013 census, its population was 437.

References

Populated places in Hadžići